Ama or AMA may refer to:

Ama

Languages 
 Ama language (New Guinea)
 Ama language (Sudan)

People 
 Ama (Ama Kōhei), former ring name for sumo wrestler Harumafuji Kōhei
 Mary Ama, a New Zealand artist
 Shola Ama, a British singer
 Āma, 8th-century Indian king

Places
Ama, Aichi, a city in Japan
Ama, Belgium, Walloon name of Amay village
Ama, Estonia, a village in Kadrina Parish, Lääne-Viru County
Ama, Iran, a village in Ilam Province
Ama, Louisiana, a town in the US
Ama, Shimane, a town in Japan
Ama, Gaiole in Chianti, a village in Tuscany, Italy

Other uses
Ama (sailing), an outrigger
Ama (diving), Japanese divers
Ama (ayurveda), anything incompletely transformed
Ama (title) of Samoan chief in Safata
Ama (given name), a feminine given name of the Akan people
Ama (film), a 2021 Spanish drama film

AMA

Medicine
 Against medical advice
 Alberta Medical Association
 American Medical Association
 Antimitochondrial antibody
 Argentine Medical Association
 Australian Medical Association

Non-medical organizations
American Motorcyclist Association
 Americana Music Association
Advanced Manageability Alliance, of Intel and IBM, introduced Wake-on-LAN technology
 Academy of Model Aeronautics, US
 Academia Mexicana de Arquitectura, architectural academy
Accra Metropolitan Assembly
 Agence Mondiale Antidopage, or World Anti-Doping Agency
 Alberta Motor Association
 AMA Computer University, the Philippines
 AMA International University, Bahrain branch of AMA
 Ama Museum, Taiwan
 American Management Association
 American Marketing Association
 American Missionary Association
 Art Museum of the Americas, Washington, D.C.
 Arts Marketing Association
 Augusta Military Academy, military academy in Fort Defiance, Virginia
 Autoridad Metropolitana de Autobuses (Metropolitan Bus Authority), Puerto Rico

Events
 American Music Awards
 Anime Mid-Atlantic, convention in Virginia, US
Aotearoa Music Awards, in New Zealand
 Australian Muslim Artists, exhibition and art prize in Melbourne, Australia
 UK Asian Music Awards (UK AMA)

People
 Augustus Akinloye (1919–2007), a Nigerian politician

Sport
 American Motorcyclist Association
AMA Superbike Championship
AMA Supersport Championship
AMA Formula Xtreme
AMA Supercross Championship
AMA Motocross Championship
AMA Grand National Championship

Other uses
 Actual mechanical advantage
 Advanced measurement approach to financial operational risk
 Alte Mozart-Ausgabe
 American Manual Alphabet
 "Ask Me Anything" on subreddit /r/IAmA
 Automatic Message Accounting of phone bills
 Rick Husband Amarillo International Airport (IATA airport code AMA)
 Veterans Appeals Improvement and Modernization Act of 2017, US legislation